Dyffryn, often Duffryn, is a small village in the Vale of Glamorgan in south Wales. It lies off the A4226 road (Five Mile Lane), along St Lythans Road, directly east of Walterston. Dyffryn is best known for its Dyffryn Gardens and its megalithic monuments nearby including the Tinkinswood and St Lythans Burial Chamber and also the caves of nearby Goldsland. The River Waycock flows through the village.

The Dyffryn Estate dates back to 640 A.D. when the Manor of Worlton (also known as Worleton), which included St Lythans and St Nicholas, was granted to Bishop Oudoceus of Llandaff.  Dyffryn House and its Edwardian garden are Grade I listed buildings and are leased to the National Trust. The 22 hectare (55 acre) landscaped gardens were designed by Thomas Mawson between 1894 and 1909, and are the largest and "most exotic" in Glamorgan.

The village itself is a wealthy community with a number of quaint houses and farms.  It also contains the Dyffryn Nurseries, Wayside Cattery, and an Aqua farm, Dyffryn Springs in Lower Dyffryn, which is a noted commercial fishing spot for trout in the county, located to the south of the main village near the hamlet of Great Hamston.

The 1811 Topographical Dictionary of Wales simply said "DYFFRYN, in the Cwmwd of Is Caeth, Cantref of Brenhinol (now called the Hundred of Dinas Powys), Co. of Glamorgan, South Wales; in the Parish of St. Nicholas. It is 6 m. W. b. S. from Caerdiff. Near Dyffryn House, which is the Property of The Honourable William Booth Grey, are several Druidical Monuments."

References

Villages in the Vale of Glamorgan